Juan Colorado is a 1966 Mexican film directed by Miguel Zacarías. It stars Antonio Aguilar, María Duval, and Elsa Cárdenas. Supporting cast includes Flor Silvestre, Carlos Agostí, Mary Castell, Antonio Raxel, and Norma Navarro.

Plot
Juan Lorenzo de la Riba (Antonio Aguilar) tries to leave his girlfriend behind, but rich hacendada Silvia Guerrero (María Duval) implies to Juan Lorenzo that he has to marry her because he defiled her honor. Silvia also states that Juan worries his father Don Artemio with his lack of responsibility. Silvia is engaged to Rafael Ortigoza (Carlos Agostí), and she intends to marry Juan Lorenzo. Silvia's father plots to assassinate Juan and Don Artemio. Silvia is tricked into believing that Juan Lorenzo is dead, and so she is forced to marry Rafael.

External links
 

1966 films
Mexican Western (genre) films
1960s Spanish-language films
1960s Mexican films